Markham Heights is a mountain peak that forms part of the Ben Lomond Range, in the northeast of Tasmania, Australia.

It is named for Sir Albert Markham, an Arctic explorer.

See also

List of highest mountains of Tasmania

References

Mountains of Tasmania
North East Tasmania